In mathematics, Clarke's generalized Jacobian is a generalization of the Jacobian matrix of a smooth function to non-smooth functions.

References

Mathematical optimization